Sharad Kulkarni is an Indian mountaineer. On 22 May 2019, Sharad climbed Mount Everest, aged 56 years and 5 months, becoming the oldest Indian to reach the summit.

Peaks scaled

Achievements 

 First Indian to climb Mount Vinson - at the age of 60.                                       
 First Indian to climb Hanuman Tibba - at the age 59.
 First Indian to climb Aconcagua, the highest peak of South America. at the age of 58.
 First Indian to climb Highest peak of Russia at the age of 59.      
 First eldest couple of india to complete the Assistant challenge with Koziosco peak in Australia. For this achievement recognized by Limca's book of records. 
 Mt. Mera, Mt. Lobuche from Nepal.
 Completed two full marathons (42.7 km) and 18 half marathons.

Wife's death 
In 2019, he lost his wife while climbing Mt. Everest under Hilary Step.

Summit at Everest 
On 22 May 2019, Sharad climbed Mount Everest, aged 56 years and 5 months, becoming the oldest Indian to reach the summit.

References 

Living people
Mount Everest
Indian mountain climbers
Mumbai
Year of birth missing (living people)